Deniss Ivanovs (born 11 January 1984) is a retired Latvian footballer who played as a defender.

Club career
Born in Liepāja, Ivanovs played in the youth team of local club Liepājas Metalurgs. Making his senior team debut in 2001, he played 9 seasons for Metalurgs, appearing in 187 league matches, scoring 9 goals, and eventually serving as captain.

In July 2009 Ivanovs went on trial with Dutch Eredivisie club, Ajax Amsterdam. He did not make the team but a month later, on 26 August 2009, he signed a three-year contract with their farm-club Ajax Cape Town of the South African Premier Soccer League. He played there for one season, making 21 appearances.

In July 2010 Ivanovs moved to Turkey, signing a two-year contract with the Süper Lig club Sivasspor. His debut came in a league match against Galatasaray which Sivasspor won 2–1. Ivanovs played all 90 minutes and received a yellow card. He appeared in 16 league matches but lost his place in the starting eleven in mid-season due to an injury. With his playing time limited, Ivanovs left Sivasspor at the end of the season.

In July 2011 Ivanovs joined the Azerbaijan Premier League club, FK Baku, with his national team teammate Māris Verpakovskis and manager Aleksandrs Starkovs. He played there for two seasons, winning the Azerbaijan Cup in 2012. Ivanovs was released by Baku at the end of the 2012–13 season.

In February 2014 Ivanovs joined the Romanian Liga I side FC Botoșani, appearing on 8 matches before leaving in mid-summer. In August 2014, after a five-year absence, Ivanovs returned to the Latvian Higher League, joining newly established FK Liepāja. After a brief spell in the winter of 2015 with Nyíregyháza Spartacus in the Nemzeti Bajnokság I, he went back to FK Liepāja where he was the captain of the team for the 2020 Latvian Higher League season. Ivanovs is individually sponsored by the company NPK Expert.

Ivanovs retired in November 2020, playing his last game for FK Liepāja.

International career

Ivanovs made his debut for Latvia at the age of 21, on 24 December 2005, in a King's Cup match against Thailand. He became a first eleven player in 2007. Ivanovs scored his first international goal on 26 March 2008 in a friendly match against Andorra. On 19 June 2010, for a Baltic Cup match against Estonia, Ivanovs was named captain of the team. As of 2015, he has collected 60 international caps and scored 2 goals.

Career statistics

Honours
Club
 Virsliga: 2005, 2009, 2015; runner-up 2003, 2004, 2006, 2007, 2008, 2017
 Latvian Cup: 2006, 2017, 2020
 Baltic League: 2007
 Azerbaijan Cup: 2011–12

International
 Baltic Cup: 2008

References

External links

1984 births
Living people
Sportspeople from Liepāja
Association football defenders
Latvian people of Russian descent
Latvian footballers
FK Liepājas Metalurgs players
Cape Town Spurs F.C. players
Sivasspor footballers
FC Baku players
FC Botoșani players
FK Liepāja players
Latvia international footballers
Latvian expatriate footballers
Süper Lig players
Liga I players
Latvian Higher League players
Azerbaijan Premier League players
Expatriate soccer players in South Africa
Expatriate footballers in Turkey
Expatriate footballers in Azerbaijan
Latvian expatriate sportspeople in Azerbaijan
Expatriate footballers in Romania
Latvian expatriate sportspeople in Romania